Andrei Dukov is a Romanian freestyle wrestler. He won one of the bronze medals in the men's freestyle 57 kg event at the 2016 European Wrestling Championships held in Riga, Latvia.

A year later, he won the silver medal in this event at the 2017 European Wrestling Championships held in Novi Sad, Serbia.

In 2019, he represented Romania at the Military World Games held in Wuhan, China and he won the silver medal in the 57 kg event.

Achievements

References

External links 
 

Living people
Year of birth missing (living people)
Place of birth missing (living people)
Romanian male sport wrestlers
European Wrestling Championships medalists
Wrestlers at the 2015 European Games
Wrestlers at the 2019 European Games
European Games competitors for Romania
21st-century Romanian people